Reus is an indie game produced by independent game studio Abbey Games. Reus is a god game in which the player controls giants who can modify the nature of the planet through terraforming, creating life, and altering genes. The game was released for Microsoft Windows on May 16, 2013.

Gameplay 

Reus involves guiding four elemental giants who have the ability to shape the two-dimensional planet. The giants can provide resources on each "patch" of land, such as animals, plants, or minerals. The goal is to provide support to the planet's humans, who act on their own and cannot be directly controlled. The actions of the player can influence the humans' behavior; for example, providing humans with too many resources can cause them to be greedy and wage wars with each other.

Development 
Reus (Dutch for "giant") was announced by its developer, Abbey Games, in a blog post on their website on June 21, 2012. On January 14, 2013, Abbey Games released an in-game trailer on YouTube outlining the game and revealing gameplay. On April 16, 2013, Abbey Games released another video on YouTube, which revealed a release day of May 16, 2013, one month later. The game is available on Steam, Desura, GOG.com, and GamersGate. The game was made available to purchasers of the Humble Indie Bundle X who spent more than the average price.

Reception 

Reus received generally favorable reviews. GameSpot awarded the game with an 8.0 out of 10 score, citing that "Reus grows into a game that presents complex challenges, a great deal of flexibility, and the freedom to determine your own standards of success, or to simply enjoy experimenting with the landscape and toying with humans." IGN gave the game a lower score, awarding the game with a 6.8 out of 10. The game's art style was praised, but its repetitiveness along with its "needlessly complex and unintuitive system of synergies and transmutations" were cause for criticism. Destructoid praised Reus and gave it a score of 9 out of 10; while flaws were mentioned, the game was cited as being "a delight to play at every turn, and it strikes the perfect balance between providing new content and not overloading players."

References

External links 
 

2013 video games
God games
Indie video games
Linux games
MacOS games
Microsoft XNA games
PlayStation 4 games
Video games developed in the Netherlands
Windows games
Xbox One games
Single-player video games